SS Sibiria was a German general cargo ship built in 1894. Originally named Hertha, she was bought by the Hamburg America Line in 1898.

In December 1902, Sibiria was chartered by the German  (Imperial Navy) to serve as a collier in support of the East American Cruiser Division during the Venezuelan crisis of 1902–1903. These operations continued into January 1903.

In May 1915 she was bought by an American company, the Atlantic Fruit Company. She foundered on 20 November 1916 on the Goodwin Sands in the English Channel. This elicited controversy in the British Press, as regards her legal status under the Trading with the Enemy Act 1914.

References

Ships of Germany
Ships built in Hamburg
1894 ships